Anupam Tripathi (born 2 November 1988) is an Indian actor based in South Korea. He has appeared in various South Korean television series and films. His first main role as Ali Abdul in Netflix's South Korean survival drama series Squid Game (2021) garnered him worldwide recognition.

Early life 
Tripathi was born into a middle-class family in New Delhi on 2 November 1988. He became interested in acting after playing a slave in a stage production of Spartacus. He was a part of the playwright Shahid Anwar's Behroop theater group from 2006 to 2010.

Tripathi began training in singing and acting in 2006. He intended to attend the National School of Drama in New Delhi but moved to South Korea in 2010 to attend Korea National University of Arts on the Arts Major Asian scholarship. He has discussed the initial difficulty of adjusting to the cultural and language differences but then became fluent in Korean in less than two years.

Career 
Tripathi began acting in Korean plays and commercials during his third year of university. His first feature film credit was as an unnamed Sri Lankan man in Ode to My Father (2014). He had a minor role as a bomb expert fighting for Korean independence in the play 불량청년, which was selected for the 36th Seoul Theater Festival, and had various minor unnamed roles in television series like Hospital Playlist (2020), Rain or Shine (2017), and films such as Space Sweepers (2021) and Asura: The City of Madness (2015). Many of his roles relate to being a migrant worker in Korean society.

Tripathi's first main cast credit was as the undocumented Pakistani worker Abdul Ali on the Netflix original series Squid Game (2021). Director Hwang Dong-hyuk said that it was "hard to find good foreign actors in Korea" and that he cast Tripathi because of his emotional acting capabilities and fluency in Korean. Following the series' international success, Tripathi's follower count on Instagram increased from 10,000 to over 2.5 million in a matter of days.

Personal life 
Tripathi is fluent in English, Hindi, and Korean. His father died in 2017.

 Tripathi is currently finishing his master's degree in acting at Korea National University of Arts.

Filmography

Film

Television

Stage

Awards and accolades

Ambassadorship 
 Ambassador for the 1st Ulsan International Film Festival (2021)

References

Further reading

External links 
 

Living people
Korea National University of Arts alumni
Indian expatriate male actors
Indian expatriates in South Korea
Male actors from New Delhi
1988 births
21st-century Indian male actors